George Robinson may refer to:

Politics and government
George Robinson (1687–1728), British Member of Parliament for Tregony
Sir George Robinson, 5th Baronet (1730–1815) of Cranford, British landowner and politician
George Robinson (Pittsburgh) (fl. 1794-c. 1800), first Chief Burgess of the borough of Pittsburgh
Sir George Robinson, 1st Baronet (1758–1832) of Batts House, Somerset, British MP and Chairman of the East India Company
Sir George Robinson, 6th Baronet (1766–1833) of Cranford, British landowner and Member of Parliament
Sir George Robinson, 2nd Baronet (1797–1855) of Batts House, Somerset, Chief Superintendent of British Trade in China
George Richard Robinson, British Member of Parliament for Worcester and Poole, elected in 1826 and 1835
George Robinson, 1st Marquess of Ripon (1827–1909), British Liberal politician
George M. Robinson, Free Soil Party member of the Wisconsin State Assembly in 1850
George D. Robinson (1834–1896), Governor of Massachusetts
George Robinson (Northern Ireland politician) (born 1941), Democratic Unionist Party politician
George S. Robinson (born 1945), North Carolina legislator
George A. Robinson, Canadian-American physician and politician

Sports
George Robinson (cricketer, born 1861) (1861–1944), played first-class cricket for Oxford University
George Robinson (cricketer, born 1873) (1873–1930), English cricketer
George Robinson (footballer, born 1878) (1878–1945), footballer for Nottingham Forest F.C. and Bradford City A.F.C.
George Robinson (Australian footballer) (1901–1962), Australian rules footballer
George Robinson (footballer, born 1908) (1908–1963), English footballer for Sunderland
George Robinson (cricketer, born 1908) (1908–1967), English cricketer
George Robinson (Australian cricketer) (1921–1999), Australian cricketer and doctor
George Robinson (New Zealand footballer) (fl. 1947), New Zealand international footballer
George Robinson (cricketer, born 1949), English cricketer
George Robinson (American football) (born 1986), offensive lineman for the Oklahoma Sooners
 George Robinson (rugby league), Australian rugby league player

Entertainment
 George Wade Robinson (1838–1877), poet and hymnist from Cork, Ireland
 George O. Robinson (fl. 1860), composer of "The Palmetto State Song"
 George Robinson (cinematographer) (1890–1958), Hollywood cinematographer
 George Robinson (actor) (born 1997), British actor

Other people
 George Robinson (swindler), English stockbroker and swindler in the 1720s and early 1730s
 George Robinson (bookseller) (1736–1801). English bookseller and publisher
 George Augustus Robinson (1791–1866), builder and preacher in Australia
 George W. Robinson (1814–1878), leader during the early history of the Latter Day Saint movement
 George Thomas Robinson (1827–1897), English architect
 George F. Robinson (1832–1907), U.S. Army soldier who save Sec. of State Seward from assassination
 George Livingston Robinson (1863–1958), author, biblical scholar, explorer, and lecturer
 George Drummond Robinson (1864–1950), British physician
 George T.O. Robinson (1922–2006), founding member of the Krio Descendants Union
 George Willard Robinson (born 1946), museum curator for whom georgerobinsonite is named
 George William Robinson (1815–1895), British entrepreneur in the Portuguese cork sector
 George Robinson (hedge fund manager) (born 1956), hedge fund manager and benefactor of Keble College, Oxford
 George Robinson, a 62-year-old black man killed on January 13, 2019 by police in Jackson, Mississippi